The Queen Elizabeth II Coronation Medal is a commemorative medal instituted to celebrate the coronation of Queen Elizabeth II on 2 June 1953.

Award
This medal was awarded as a personal souvenir from the Queen to members of the Royal Family and selected officers of state, members of the Royal Household, government officials, mayors, public servants, local government officials, members of the navy, army, air force and police in Britain, her colonies and Dominions. It was also awarded to members of the Mount Everest expedition, two of whom reached the summit four days before the coronation. It was struck at the Royal Mint and issued immediately after the coronation.

For Coronation and Jubilee medals, the practice up until 1977 was that the authorities in the United Kingdom decided on a total number to be produced, then allocated a proportion to each of the Commonwealth countries and Crown dependencies and other possessions of the Crown. The award of the medals was then at the discretion of the government of each territory, which was left free to decide who was to be awarded a medal and why.

A total of 129,051 medals were awarded, including:
11,561 to Australians.
12,500 to Canadians.

Description

The Queen Elizabeth II Coronation Medal is a silver disk, 1.25 inches in diameter. The obverse features a crowned effigy of Queen Elizabeth II, facing right, in a high-collared ermine cloak and wearing the collar of the Garter and Badge of the Bath. There is no raised rim and no legend.

The reverse shows the Royal Cypher  surmounted by a large crown. The legend around the edge reads "QUEEN ELIZABETH II CROWNED 2nd JUNE 1953". The medal was designed by Cecil Thomas.

Ladies who were awarded the Queen Elizabeth II Coronation Medal, can wear it on their left shoulder with the ribbon tied in the form of a bow.

The medals were issued unnamed, except for the 37 issued to the British Mount Everest Expedition.  These were engraved "MOUNT EVEREST EXPEDITION" on the rim.

Precedence by country
Some orders of precedence are as follows:

Notable recipients

Brunei 

 Alam Abdul Rahman

Nepal
 Tenzing Norgay

New Zealand
The following list includes notable New Zealanders who received the Queen Elizabeth II Coronation Medal, and is not an exhaustive list of recipients.

A
 Hugh Acland
 Ernest Aderman
 Henry Ah Kew
 Robert Aitken
 Tofilau Eti Alesana
 Allen Alexander
 Ronald Algie
 Robin Allan
 Geoff Alley
 Annie Allum
 John Allum
 Claude Anaru
 Harry Anderson
 Bill Anderton
 John Andrew
 Leslie Andrew
 John Andrews
 Will Appleton
 Gilbert Archey
 Thomas Ashby
 Bernard Ashwin
 Alexander Astor

B
 Wiri Baker
 Doug Ball
 Harry Barker
 Bill Barnard
 Fred Barnard
 Jim Barnes
 Miles Barnett
 Bill Barrett
 Harold Barrowclough
 Cyril Bassett
 Eric Batchelor
 Ed Bate
 Ernest Bathurst
 Ken Baxter
 Clive Beadon
 C. E. Beeby
 Matt Benney
 Carl Berendsen
 Fred Betham
 Thyra Bethell
 William Blacklock
 Tom Bloodworth
 Denis Blundell
 Roger Blunt
 Bert Bockett
 William Bodkin
 George Bolt
 Charles Bowden
 Fred Bowerbank
 Michael Bowles
 Warwick Braithwaite
 Thomas Brash
 Cyprian Brereton
 William Bretton
 Bob Briggs
 William Bringans
 Walter Broadfoot
 Bill Brown
 Malcolm Burns
 Jim Burrows
 Peter Butler

C
 John Cairney
 Frank Callaghan
 Flora Cameron
 Dick Campbell
 Alan Candy
 Edward Caradus
 David Carnegie
 Harold Caro
 Clyde Carr
 Turi Carroll
 Ernest Caygill
 Charles Henry Chapman
 Johnny Checketts
 Hector Christie
 George Clifton
 George Clinkard
 Harry Combs
 Eric Compton
 Michael Connelly
 Phil Connolly
 Philip Cooke
 Bert Cooksley
 Ernest Corbett
 Frank Corner
 Joe Cotterill
 Charles Cotton
 Robert Coupland
 John Court
 James Crichton
 William Cunningham
 George Currie

D
 Clifford Dalton
 Joseph Darnand
 Arthur Davenport
 Alfred Davey
 Eliot Davis
 Ernest Davis
 Stanley Dean
 James Deas
 Helen Deem
 Reginald Delargey
 Rangitīaria Dennan
 Edwin Dixon
 Frederick Doidge
 Viva Donaldson
 Arthur Donnelly
 Percy Dowse
 Harry Dudfield
 Roger Duff
 Mason Durie

E
 James Elliott
 Keith Elliott
 Ned Ellison
 Sam Emery
 Mary Enright
 Pat Entrican
 Dean Eyre

F
 Robert Falla
 Flora Forde

G
 Victor Galway
 Elizabeth Gilmer

H
 Tristan Hegglun
 Edmund Hillary
 Tom Horton
 Clive Hulme

K
 Paddy Kearins

M
 Korokī Mahuta
 Jack Marshall

N
 Edgar Neale
 Erima Northcroft

P
 Rusty Page

R
 Edith Rudd

S
 Percy Storkey

T
 Harold Tait
 Peter Tait
 Hepi Te Heuheu
 Blair Tennent
 David Thomson
 Percy Thomson
 Jim Thorn
 Edward Thorne
 Leonard Thornton
 Eruera Tirikatene
 Ernest Toop
 Geoffrey Tremaine
 Leonard Trent
 Tualaulelei Mauri
 Tupua Tamasese Meaʻole
 Harold Turbott
 George Turkington
 Fred Turley
 Charles Turner
 Patrick Joseph Twomey
 Arthur Tyndall

U
 Charles Upham

W
 Ron Wakelin
 Mark Wallace
 Robert Walls
 Fintan Patrick Walsh
 George Walsh
 John Walsh
 Bob Walton
 Joseph Ward
 Alwyn Warren
 Ellenor Watson
 James Wattie
 Jack Watts
 Clifton Webb
 John Weeks
 Stephen Weir
 George Weston
 Ronald Erle White
 William Whitlock
 Agnes, Lady Wigram
 Leonard Wild
 Lionel Wilkinson
 Gordon Wilson
 Ivon Wilson
 Joseph Vivian Wilson
 Stanley Wilson
 Frederick Wood
 George Wood
 Jack Wright
 Len Wright

Tonga
 Sālote Tupou III

See also
 Queen Elizabeth II Silver Jubilee Medal
 Queen Elizabeth II Golden Jubilee Medal
 Queen Elizabeth II Diamond Jubilee Medal
 Queen Elizabeth II Platinum Jubilee Medal

References

Civil awards and decorations of Australia
Civil awards and decorations of Canada
Civil awards and decorations of New Zealand
Awards and decorations of Ceylon
Civil awards and decorations of the United Kingdom
Medal
1953 establishments in the United Kingdom
Military decorations and medals of South Africa
Awards established in 1953